King Hedjkheperre Setepenamun Harsiese, or Harsiese A, is viewed by the Egyptologist Kenneth Kitchen in his Third Intermediate Period of Egypt to be both a High Priest of Amun and the son of the High Priest of Amun, Shoshenq C. The archaeological evidence does suggest that he was indeed Shoshenq C's son. However, recent published studies by the German Egyptologist Karl Jansen-Winkeln in JEA 81 (1995) have demonstrated that all the monuments of the first (king) Harsiese show that he was never a High Priest of Amun in his own right. Rather both Harsiese A and his son [...du] – whose existence is known from inscriptions on the latter's funerary objects at Coptos – are only attested as Ordinary Priests of Amun. Instead, while Harsiese A was certainly an independent king at Thebes during the first decade of Osorkon II's kingship, he was a different person from a second person who was also called Harsiese: Harsiese B. Harsiese B was the genuine High Priest of Amun, who is attested in office late in Osorkon II's reign, in the regnal year 6 of Shoshenq III and in regnal years 18 and 19 of Pedubast I, according to Jansen-Winkeln.

While Harsiese A may have become king at Thebes prior to Year 4 of Osorkon II, contra Kitchen, he certainly ruled Thebes during the first decade of Osorkon II's reign as Kitchen notes. Osorkon II's control over this great city is only first documented by two separate Year 12 Nile Level Texts, which means that Harsiese had died by this time. If Harsiese was already ruling at Thebes earlier under Takelot I, it might help explain why Takelot I's own Year 5, Year 8, and Year 14 Nile Level Texts, which mention the serving High Priests Iuwelot and Smendes III—who were all brothers of Takelot I--consistently omit any mention of Takelot's name, as Gerard Broekman aptly notes in an article in JEA (88 (2002)). Takelot I's name is left deliberately blank here. This might indicate a possible rivalry between Takelot I and Harsiese A at Thebes. The Amun Priests may have chosen not to involve themselves in this dispute by omitting any mention of the reigning king's name.

Burial
According to a 1994 book by the English Egyptologist Aidan Dodson, King Harsiese:

Dodson notes that Harsiese's coffin is similar in style to the hawk-headed silver coffin of Shoshenq II, and to the surviving "traces of the gilded coffin and cartonnage of Osorkon II" (pp. 88–89).

References
 Gerard Broekman, "The Nile Level Records of the Twenty-Second and Twenty-Third Dynasties in Karnak," Journal of Egyptian Archaeology 88 (2002), pp. 163–178.
 Aidan Dodson, The Canopic Equipment of the Kings of Egypt, (Kegan Paul Intl: 1994), pp. 88–89 and p. 92.
 Karl Jansen-Winkeln, "Historische Probleme Der 3. Zwischenzeit," Journal of Egyptian Archaeology 81 (1995), pp. 129–149.
 K.A. Kitchen, The Third Intermediate Period in Egypt (1100–650 BC), 3rd ed. Warminster: Aris and Phillips Limited, (1996)
 John H. Taylor, "A daughter of King Harsiese", Journal of Egyptian Archaeology 74 (1988), pp. 230–231.

9th-century BC Pharaohs
Pharaohs of the Twenty-second Dynasty of Egypt